The Danton-class battleship was a class of six semi-dreadnought battleships built for the French Navy (Marine Nationale) before World War I. The ships were assigned to the Mediterranean Fleet after commissioning in 1911. After the beginning of World War I in early August 1914, five of the sister ships participated in the Battle of Antivari. They spent most of the rest of the war blockading the Straits of Otranto and the Dardanelles to prevent warships of the Central Powers from breaking out into the Mediterranean. One ship was sunk by a German submarine in 1917.

The remaining five ships were obsolescent by the end of the war and most were assigned to secondary roles. Two of the sisters were sent to the Black Sea to support the Whites during the Russian Civil War. One ship ran aground and the crew of the other mutinied after one of its members was killed during a protest against intervention in support of the Whites. Both ships were quickly condemned and later sold for scrap. The remaining three sisters received partial modernizations in the mid-1920s and became training ships until they were condemned in the mid-1930s and later scrapped. The only survivor still afloat at the beginning of World War II in August 1939 had been hulked in 1931 and was serving as part of the navy's torpedo school. She was captured by the Germans when they occupied Vichy France in 1942 and scuttled by them after the Allied invasion of southern France in 1944.

Background and description

The Danton-class ships were ordered as the second tranche of a French naval expansion plan that began in response to the growth of the Imperial German Navy after 1900. Discussions began in 1905 for an enlarged version of the preceding  design. French analyses of the Russian defeat by the Japanese at the Battle of Tsushima in May 1905 credited the latter's victory to the large number of medium-caliber hits that heavily damaged the superstructures of the Russian ships and started many fires that the crews had difficulty extinguishing. The superior speed and handling of the Japanese ships was also credited with a role in their victory.

The French decided that the increasing range of naval combat dictated the use of the  gun in lieu of the  gun used on the Liberté class as the larger gun had a greater ability to penetrate armor at longer ranges while still having a good rate of fire. The navy also wanted a faster ship, but this could only be done by reducing armor thicknesses without exceeding the  limit imposed by the Minister of the Navy, Gaston Thomson, for budgetary reasons. A preliminary design with the usual triple-expansion steam engines was accepted in March 1906, but various modifications were requested. One proposal was made to replace the 240-millimeter guns turrets with single  turrets to create an "all-big-gun" ship, like the British battleship HMS Dreadnought, but this was rejected as it would have raised the displacement above the 18,000-metric ton limit and the slower-firing 305-millimeter guns would have reduced the volume and weight of fire to an unacceptable degree.

Initial parliamentary discussion of the design focused less on the anticipated cost of the ships than the idea that France was being left behind in the technological arms race, particularly in regard to the innovative Parsons steam turbines used by HMS Dreadnought. In response the navy sent a technical mission to inspect the Parsons factory, several shipyards, and gun factories as well as the Barr & Stroud rangefinder factory in May 1906 and concluded that the turbines offered more power in a smaller volume than triple-expansion steam engines at a significant increase in fuel consumption at low speeds. Two ships had already been ordered from the naval dockyards three months previously when the navy decided to use the turbines in July. To further complicate things, Thomson requested a study using the heavier and more powerful 45-caliber 305-millimeter Modèle 1906 gun on 3 August while not endorsing the navy's decision to use turbines. On 6 October the director of naval construction, M. Dudebout, urgently requested a decision while recommending that three ships use triple-expansion steam engines and the other three use steam turbines. He felt that this would minimize delays and expense as the design needed to be modified to accommodate the turbines and their four propeller shafts, no company in France knew how to build the turbines, and the latter were three times as expensive as steam engines. Thomson was inclined to accept Dudebout's recommendation, but prevaricated until December, after parliamentary debates showed overwhelming support for turbines in all six ships. Contracts for the remaining four ships were signed on 26 December, the day after the conclusion of the debate. Thomson also delayed in deciding on which boilers to use. He sent another technical mission to Britain to look at Babcock & Wilcox's design in April 1907, but did not make a decision in favor of French-built boilers until 3 June 1908, after all the ships had been laid down.

The design was estimated to displace  before the adoption of the heavier Modèle 1906 gun required a new and larger turret to handle the gun which meant that the turret's supporting structure also had to be reinforced. In an unsuccessful bid to reduce the displacement, many sections of armor were reduced in thickness, but the ships exceeded even the design estimate as built.

General description
The Dantons were significantly larger than their predecessors of the Liberté class. The Danton-class ships were slightly overweight; they actually displaced  at normal load. This was over  more than the earlier ships. When serving as flagships, their crew consisted of 40 officers and 875 enlisted men. Without an admiral and his staff embarked, the crew numbered 28 officers and 824 enlisted men.

Propulsion

The Danton-class ships had four license-built Parsons direct-drive steam turbines, each of which drove a single propeller, using steam from 26 coal-fired Belleville or Niclausse boilers. Each boiler type was installed on three ships of the class. The boilers were housed in two large compartments, 17 in the forward boiler room that used the three forward funnels and 9 in the aft boiler which exhausted through the rear pair of funnels. The turbines were amidships, between the boiler rooms, in three compartments. The center engine room housed the turbines for the two center propeller shafts and the turbine for each of the outer shafts had their own compartment flanking the center engine room.

The Niclausse boilers were not well suited for use with turbines and burned more coal than the Belleville boilers. They also produced copious amounts of smoke and sparks; occasionally even flames from incomplete combustion of the coal. Their endurance was almost half that of their predecessors due to the uneconomical fuel consumption of their turbines at low speeds and meant that they needed frequent coaling stops during the war.

Armament
The main battery of the Danton-class ships consisted of four 305 mm Modèle 1906 guns mounted in two twin-gun turrets, one each fore and aft of the superstructure. Each turret stored eight rounds along the rear wall and their propellant was kept between the floor of the firing chamber and the bottom of the turret. The ships normally stowed 75 rounds per gun, but space was available for an additional 10 rounds. Their secondary armament consisted of twelve 240mm/50 Modèle 1902 guns in six twin-gun turrets, three on each side of the ship. The guns could fire at a rate of two rounds per minute. Each turret had space for 12 shells and the necessary 36 propellant charges; 80 rounds per gun was normally carried, but maximum capacity was 100 rounds per gun.

The Dantons  carried a number of smaller guns to defend themselves against torpedo boats. These included sixteen  Modèle 1908 Schneider guns mounted in unarmored embrasures in the hull sides. Because the shell hoists were slow and the shells difficult to handle in their three-round cases in the magazines, a total of 576 rounds were stored close to the guns in ready-use lockers. Each gun was provided with 400 rounds, but the maximum storage available was 430 rounds per gun. The ships also mounted ten  Hotchkiss guns in pivot mounts on the superstructure. Each gun had 36 rounds nearby in ready-use lockers and the ships were provided with a maximum of 800 rounds per gun.

The battleships were also armed with two submerged  torpedo tubes, one on each broadside. Each tube was angled 10° forward and 3° downward. Each ship carried six Modèle 1909R torpedoes. These could not be laid by the ships themselves, but had to be off-loaded for use.

Fire control
Finding the British Barr & Stroud coincidence rangefinder design superior to existing French designs, the Dantons mounted a pair of  FQ rangefinders atop the conning tower and a  rangefinder on each turret top for use by the turret commanders. Integrating these into the overall fire-control system took some time, so eight Ponthus & Therrode stadimeters, which required knowledge of the target's mast height and overall length, were used in the interim. During the war, the rangefinders were replaced by longer, more precise instruments. A triple  model was installed above the conning tower and 2-meter models replaced the smaller ones on the turret roofs.

Armor
It extended almost the entire length of the ship, with only the very stern unprotected. At the stern, the belt terminated in a  transverse bulkhead; the forward  transverse bulkhead connected the sides of the forward barbette to the belt.

The main gun turrets had  of armor on their faces,  sides, and roofs of three layers of  mild-steel plates. The secondary gun turrets had  faces,  sides, and a roof of three layers of  plates. The 240-millimeter turret barbettes had sides . The walls of its communication tube down to the fire-control center (poste central de tir) were 200 millimeters thick down to the upper protected deck.

The lower of these, the PBI, curved downwards towards the sides of the hull to meet the torpedo bulkhead and the curved portion was reinforced by the substitution of a  plate of armor in lieu of the uppermost 15-millimeter plate of mild steel. The PBI also sloped downward toward the bow and was similarly reinforced to form an armored glacis. It was backed by a torpedo bulkhead that consisted of three layers of 15-millimeter armor plate. Inboard of the bulkhead were 16 watertight compartments, 12 of which were normally kept empty, but the 4 abreast the boiler rooms were used as coal bunkers. This system of protection had only mixed success in practice as Danton capsized in 40 minutes after two torpedo hits while Voltaire survived her two torpedoes.

Ships

Construction and careers
The Dantons took a long time to build. Construction was prolonged by a number of factors, chief of which were the 500 plus changes were made to the original design and in the inability of Thomson to make a timely decision. This meant that the builders sometimes had to rip out already completed sections to incorporate the modifications. Other problems were shortages of necessary infrastructure at the shipyards, lengthy delays in delivery of parts, and labor shortages and a lack of building slips in the naval dockyards. For example, water in the lower end of the newly completed Point-du-Jour slip at Brest meant that building Dantons stern was delayed four months after the bow began and construction of Mirabeau could not begin until the armored cruiser  was launched.

After commissioning in 1911, all six ships were assigned to the First Battle Squadron (Première escadre de ligne) of the Mediterranean Fleet where they participated in the fleet maneuvers in May–June 1913. When the war began, the squadron, under the command of Vice Admiral Paul Chocheprat, was at sea preparing to escort troop convoys from French North Africa to France. Some of the ships unsuccessfully searched for the German battlecruiser  and the light cruiser  in the Western Mediterranean and escorted convoys. Later that month, all of the ships, except Mirabeau, participated in the Battle of Antivari in the Adriatic Sea and helped to sink an Austro-Hungarian protected cruiser. They spent most of the rest of the war blockading the Straits of Otranto and the Dardanelles to prevent German, Austro-Hungarian and Turkish warships from breaking out. Mirabeau participated in the attempt to ensure Greek acquiescence to Allied operations in Macedonia in late 1916.

Post war

Diderot, Mirabeau and Vergniaud briefly participated in the occupation of Constantinople after the end of the war and the latter two ships were sent to the Black Sea in early 1919 during the Southern Russia Intervention. Vergniauds crew mutinied after one of its members was killed when a protest against intervention in support of the Whites was bloodily suppressed and forced the return of the French ships supporting the Whites. Mirabeau ran aground in February 1919 off the coast of the Crimea and could not be refloated until some of her guns and armor were removed.

All of the surviving ships except Condorcet were reduced to second-line roles by 1920. Mirabeau was not repaired after her salvage and was hulked for a few years before being sold. Vergniaud was in bad shape and became a target ship before she was sold for scrap. Voltaire and Diderot had their underwater protection modernized in the early 1920s and became training ships before they were condemned in the mid-1930s. Condorcet was assigned to the Channel Division in the early 1920s before she too had her underwater protection modernized. She also became a training ship after its completion, but she was hulked in 1931 and became a depot ship for the torpedo school. The ship was captured intact when the Germans occupied Toulon in November 1942 and was used by them as a barracks ship. Condorcet was scuttled by the Germans in August 1944 and refloated the following year before being scrapped.

Notes

Bibliography

External links

 page from Battleship-cruisers.co.uk

Battleship classes
 
 
Ship classes of the French Navy